Guillermo Martínez Ginoris (born 25 June 1943) is a Cuban water polo player. He competed at the 1968 Summer Olympics and the 1972 Summer Olympics.

References

1943 births
Living people
Cuban male water polo players
Olympic water polo players of Cuba
Water polo players at the 1968 Summer Olympics
Water polo players at the 1972 Summer Olympics
Sportspeople from Havana
Pan American Games bronze medalists for Cuba
Water polo players at the 1995 Pan American Games
Pan American Games medalists in water polo
Medalists at the 1995 Pan American Games